Ulla Margareta Charlotte Cederschiöld (born 28 September 1944 in Gävle) is a Swedish politician and was a Member of the European Parliament until 2009. She is a member of the Moderate Party, part of the European People's Party - European Democrats group.

She sits on the European Parliament's Committee on the Internal Market and Consumer Protection. She is also a substitute for the Committee on Civil Liberties, Justice and Home Affairs, a member of the Delegation for relations with Russia and a substitute for the Delegation for relations with the United States.

She has been married to Carl Cederschiöld since 1972, with whom she has two children Sebastian (1974) and Anna (1981).

She is a signatory of the Prague Declaration on European Conscience and Communism.

Education
She graduated from Stockholm University in 1970, with a degree in political science, law, history and German, and after graduating became an information manager for the Swedish Institute and City of Stockholm Development and Promotion Office.

Career
Member Moderate Party executive 1990-1995
Member Stockholm County Authority 1979-1988
Member of Parliament (Riksdag) 1988-1995
First vice-chair European Union of Women 1993-1999
MEP 1995-
Substitute to the Institutional Committee 1995-1999
Vice-president European Parliament, bureau member and chairwoman of the Conciliation Committee 2001-2004
Member of The Committee on Citizens' Freedoms and Rights, Justice and Home Affairs 1999-2004
Substitute to The Committee on Legal Affairs and the Internal Market 1999-2004
Member of The Delegation for relations with the United States 1999-2004
Member of the Convention for Fundamental Rights (1999–2000)
Member of The Mercosur Delegation 2004-2007
Vice-chair of The Internal Market and Consumer Protection Committee 2004-2006
Member of The Internal Market and Consumer Protection Committee 2007
Substitute to The Delegation for Relations with the United States 2004-
Member of the Civil Liberties, Justice and Home Affairs Committee 1995-2006
Substitute to the Civil Liberties, Justice and Home Affairs Committee 2006
Member of the Russia Delegation 2007
Member of the Echelon committee
Rapporteur on the following reports:
Attacks against information systems and communication networks, protection against counterfeiting the Euro, fight against drugs, organised crime, police co-operation in relation to synthetic drugs, intellectual property (The WIPO Treaties) and the development of the third pillar during the Intergovernmental Conference 1996-97. Fundamental rights, enhanced corporation, competition, crime prevention, shadow rapporteur on health in the single market, many reports on openness and transparency as well as data protection.

See also
 2004 European Parliament election in Sweden

References

External links
 
 
 

1944 births
Living people
People from Gävle
Moderate Party politicians
Members of the Riksdag
Women members of the Riksdag
Moderate Party MEPs
MEPs for Sweden 1995–1999
MEPs for Sweden 1999–2004
MEPs for Sweden 2004–2009
20th-century women MEPs for Sweden
21st-century women MEPs for Sweden